The Science Mission Directorate (SMD) of the National Aeronautics and Space Administration (NASA) engages the United States’ science community, sponsors scientific research, and develops and deploys satellites and probes in collaboration with NASA's partners around the world to answer fundamental questions requiring the view from and into space.

The Science Mission Directorate also sponsors research that both enables, and is enabled by, NASA's exploration activities. The SMD portfolio is contributing to NASA's achievement of the Vision for Space Exploration by striving to:

Understand the history of Mars and the formation of the solar system. By understanding the formation of diverse terrestrial planets (with atmospheres) in the solar system, researchers learn more about Earth's future and the most promising opportunities for habitation beyond our planet. For example, differences in the impacts of collisional processes on Earth, the Moon, and Mars can provide clues about differences in origin and evolution of each of these bodies.
Search for Earth-like planets and habitable environments around other stars. SMD pursues multiple research strategies with the goal of developing effective astronomically-detectable signatures of biological processes. The study of the Earth-Sun system may help researchers identify atmospheric biosignatures that distinguish Earth-like (and potentially habitable) planets around nearby stars. An understanding of the origin of life and the time evolution of the atmosphere on Earth may reveal likely signatures of life on extrasolar planets.
Explore the solar system for scientific purposes while supporting safe robotic and human exploration of space. For example, large-scale coronal mass ejections from the Sun can cause potentially lethal consequences for improperly shielded human flight systems, as well as some types of robotic systems. SMD's pursuit of interdisciplinary scientific research focus areas will help predict potentially harmful conditions in space and protect NASA's robotic and human explorers.

Leadership
Nicola Fox is the Associate Administrator for the Science Mission Directorate beginning February 27, 2023. Recent Associate Administrators for the SMD include Edward J. Weiler (1998–2004, 2008–2011), Mary L. Cleave (2004–2005), Alan Stern (2007–2008), John M. Grunsfeld (2012–2016), and Thomas Zurbuchen (2016-2022).  Stern resigned 25 March 2008, to be effective 11 April, over disagreements with Administrator Michael D. Griffin.

Associate Administrator: Nicola Fox 
Deputy Associate Administrator: Sandra Connelly
Heliophysics Division Director: Margaret (Peg) Luce (acting)
Earth Science Division Director: Karen St. Germain
Planetary Science Division Director: Lori Glaze
Astrophysics Division Director: Mark Clampin
Biological and Physical Sciences Division Director: Craig Kundrot
Resource Management Division Director: Holly Degn
Joint Agency Satellite Division Director: John Gagosian
Science Engagement and Partnerships Division Director: Kristen J Erickson

References

External links
About the Science Mission Directorate

NASA groups, organizations, and centers